Beth Alpha (Bet Alpha, Bet Alfa) is a sixth-century CE synagogue located at the foot of the northern slopes of the Gilboa mountains near Beit She'an, Israel. It is now part of Bet Alfa Synagogue National Park and managed by the Israel Nature and Parks Authority.

Excavations
The Beth Alpha synagogue was uncovered in 1928 by members of the nearby Kibbutz Hefzibah, who stumbled upon the synagogue's extensive mosaic floors during irrigation construction. Excavations began in 1929 under the auspices of the Hebrew University of Jerusalem and were led by Israeli archaeologist, Eleazar Sukenik. A secondary round of excavations, sponsored by the Israel Antiquities Authority in 1962, further explored the residential structures surrounding the synagogue.

In addition, a hoard of 36 Byzantine coins were found in a shallow depression in the floor apse.

Architecture
Architectural remains from the Beth Alpha synagogue indicate that the synagogue once stood as two-story basilical building and contained a courtyard, vestibule, and prayer hall. The first floor of the prayer hall consisted of a central nave measuring 5.4 meters wide, the apse, which served as the resting place for the Torah Ark, the bimah, the raised platform upon which the Torah would have been read, and benches. The Torah Ark within the apse was aligned southwest, in the direction of Jerusalem.

Dedicatory inscriptions
 The northern entryway features two dedicatory inscriptions in Aramaic and Greek. Although partially destroyed, the Aramaic inscription indicates that the synagogue was built during the reign of  the Byzantine Emperor Justinus, probably Justin I (518–527 CE), and was funded by communal donations. The Greek inscription thanks artisans "Marianos and his son Hanina", who were also listed as the artisans of the nearby Beth Shean synagogue. The inscriptions are flanked on either side by a lion and a buffalo, who serve as the synagogue's symbolic guardians.

Nave mosaics

Northern panel—Binding of Isaac
 The northern panel depicts the "Binding of Isaac" (Genesis 22: 1–18). To the right, Abraham is depicted dangling Isaac over the fiery altar as he raises his hand to perform the sacrifice. In the center, God, symbolized by the small fire- encircled hand appearing in the upper center, instructs Abraham to sacrifice a nearby ram instead of Isaac. The hand of God is aptly labeled with "al tishlah" or "do not raise", taken from God's command to the angel that Abraham not "raise his hand against the boy [Isaac]" (Genesis 22:12). In the lower center of the composition, immediately below the hand of God, the ram that served as Isaac's substitute is positioned standing sideways, trapped in the nearby thicket. The odd positioning of the ram may perhaps be a convention the artists used to convey the distance that the Bible says separated Abraham and Isaac, from the two servant boys (Genesis 22:5), who accompanied Abraham and Isaac on their journey, and are depicted standing to the left. All the figures in the scene, except for the two servants, are identified with Hebrew labels.

The iconographic significance of the "Binding of Isaac" is unclear. There is a wide variety of opinions, with some scholars seeing this narrative as an affirmation of God's mercy, others as symbolic of his continuing covenant with Israel, and others as embodying the rabbinic notion of "zechut avot" or the merit of the fathers. In contemporaneous Christian church art, where the "Binding of Isaac" was also a popular theme, the narrative was seen as a typological pre-figuration for the crucifixion.

Central panel—zodiac wheel
 The central panel features a Jewish adaptation of the Greco-Roman zodiac. The zodiac consists of two concentric circles, with the twelve zodiac signs appearing in the outer circle, and Helios, the Greco-Roman sun god, appearing in the inner circle. The outer circle consists of twelve panels, each of which correspond to one of the twelve months of the year and contain the appropriate Greco-Roman zodiac sign. Female busts symbolizing the four seasons appear in the four corners immediately outside the zodiac. In the center, Helios appears with his signature Greco-Roman iconographic elements such as the fiery crown of rays adorning his head and the highly stylized quadriga or four-horse-drawn chariot. The background is decorated with a crescent shaped moon and stars. As in the "Binding of Isaac" panel, the zodiac symbols and seasonal busts are labeled with their corresponding Hebrew names.

This zodiac wheel, along with other similar examples found in contemporaneous synagogues throughout Israel such as Naaran, Susiya, Hamat Tiberias, Huseifa, and Sepphoris, rest at the center of a scholarly debate regarding the relationship between Judaism and general Greco-Roman culture in late-antiquity. Some interpret the popularity that the zodiac maintains within synagogue floors as evidence for its Judaization and adaptation into the Jewish calendar and liturgy. Others see it as representing the existence of a "non-Rabbinic" or a mystical and Hellenized form of Judaism that embraced the astral religion of Greco-Roman culture.

Southern panel—synagogue scene
The southern panel, which was laid before the synagogue's Torah Shrine, is a liturgically oriented scene that emphasizes the centrality of the Torah Shrine. The Torah Shrine stands at the center of the composition and is depicted with a gabled roof. The Torah Shrine is decorated with ornamented panels featuring diamonds and squares. The floating conch shell seen in the center of the roof, is a stylized representation of the Torah Shrine's inset arch. A hanging lamp is suspended from the gable of the roof. As a symbolic marker of its importance, the lower register of the Torah Shrine is flanked by two roaring lions and is surrounded by Jewish ritual objects such as the lulav, etrog, shofar, and incense shovel. Two birds flank the gabled roof in the upper register of the Torah Shrine.

Two large seven-branched Menorot candelabras stand on either of the Torah shrine. The base and branches of the two Menorot are not identical in form; the right-hand Menorah has an upright base, while the left-hand Menorah has two crescent shaped legs and one upright leg. Lastly, the entire scene is framed by the two pulled back curtains, which served to demarcate the sacred space of the Torah Shrine.

The presence of the Menorah, which originally stood in the Jerusalem Temple, comes to highlight the continuing importance that the Jerusalem Temple occupied in the development of the synagogue. Additionally, the Menorah also maintained a practical function, as the primary light source for the area around the Torah Shrine. Sukenik believed that the two Menorot depicted flanking the Torah Shrine in this scene, likely stood adjacent to the Torah Shrine within the actual Beth Alpha synagogue.

See also
Ancient synagogues in the Palestine region
Ancient synagogues in Israel
Archaeology of Israel

References

Bibliography
Avigad, Nahman. "Beth Alpha". Encyclopaedia Judaica vol. 4. Jerusalem: Keter Publishing House, 1972.
Fine, Steven. Art and Judaism in the Greco-Roman World. Cambridge: Cambridge University Press, 2010. 
Goodenough, E. R. "Astronomical Symbols" in Jewish Symbols in the Greco-Roman Period vol. 8, II. New York: Bollingen Foundation, 1958.
Hachlili, Rachel. Ancient Jewish Art and Archaeology in the Land of Israel. Leiden: Brill, 1997. 
Magness, Jodi. "Heaven on Earth: Helios and the Zodiac Cycle in Ancient Palestinian Synagogues". Dumbarton Oaks Papers vol. 59 (2005): 1–52.
Sukenik, Eleazar Lipa. The Ancient Synagogue of Beth Alpha. New Jersey: Georgias Press, 2007.

External links

Bet Alfa Synagogue National Park official website
Photos of Bet Alpha Synagogue at the Manar al-Athar photo archive

6th-century synagogues
6th-century establishments in the Byzantine Empire
1928 archaeological discoveries
Ancient synagogues in the Land of Israel
Byzantine synagogues
National parks of Israel
Archaeological museums in Israel
Museums in Northern District (Israel)
Byzantine mosaics
Medieval Greek inscriptions
Byzantine Empire-related inscriptions
Aramaic inscriptions
Judaic inscriptions
Jewish art
Archaeological sites in Israel
Protected areas of Northern District (Israel)
Buildings and structures in Northern District (Israel)
Israeli mosaics